Traveller Supplement Adventure 1: The Kinunir is a science fiction tabletop role-playing adventure, by an unknown writer, and published by Game Designers' Workshop in 1979. Written by Marc W. Miller. The Kinunir was the first adventure published for Traveller, winning the H.G. Wells award for Best Roleplaying Adventure of 1979.

Plot summary
Set in the Imperial timeline in 1105, The Kinunir involves a small Imperial warship, now missing under mysterious circumstances.

Reception
Forrest Johnson reviewed The Kinunir in The Space Gamer No. 28. Johnson commented that "Could be fun. A prize for referees - but only a very imaginative and painstaking referee will be able to make full use of it. A challenge for any group of players."

Bob McWilliams reviewed The Kinunir for White Dwarf #19, giving it an overall rating of 9 out of 10, and stated that "I refrain from giving this the maximum rating only because GDW may well do even better in future -- recommended without hesitation."

The Kinunir won the Charles S. Roberts Award for Best Roleplaying Adventure of 1979.

References

Origins Award winners
Role-playing game supplements introduced in 1979
Traveller (role-playing game) adventures